Chakosi, or Anufo, may be:
Chakosi people
the Chakosi language